Armina tigrina is a species of sea slug, a nudibranch, a marine gastropod mollusk in the family Arminidae.

References

Arminidae
Gastropods described in 1814
Taxa named by Constantine Samuel Rafinesque